Zapodidae, the jumping mice, is a family of mouse-like rodents in North America and China.

Although mouse-like in general appearance, these rodents are distinguished by their elongated hind limbs, and, typically, by the presence of four pairs of cheek-teeth in each jaw. There are five toes to all the feet, but the first in the fore-feet is rudimentary, and furnished with a flat nail. The tail makes up about 60% of its body length and is used to gain balance while jumping. The cheeks have pouches. The Sichuan jumping "yeti" mouse (Eozapus setchuanus) from China can be identified by the ‘Y’ marking on its belly.

Jumping mice live in wooded areas, grassy fields and alpine meadows. When disturbed, they start, in enormous bounds of eight or ten feet in length, which soon diminish to three or four, and in leaping the feet scarcely seem to touch the ground. They are nocturnal and generally live alone. The nest is placed in clefts of rocks, among timber, or in hollow trees, and there are generally three litters in a season.

Taxonomy 
Formerly classified in the subfamily Zapodinae alongside the birch mice and jerboas within the greater family Dipodidae, phylogenetic analysis has found the jumping mice, birch mice, and jerboas to each form their own family, with Dipodidae being restricted to the jerboas. All three families are thought to belong to the greater superfamily Dipodoidea.

Classification

There are 11 recent species listed by the American Society of Mammalogists as of 2021.

Family Zapodidae, jumping mice 
Genus Eozapus
Chinese jumping mouse, Eozapus setchuanus
Genus Napaeozapus
Western woodland jumping mouse, Napaeozapus abietorum
Eastern woodland jumping mouse, Napaeozapus insignis
Genus Zapus
Northern meadow jumping mouse, Zapus hudsonius
Southern meadow jumping mouse, Zapus luteus
Central Pacific jumping mouse, Zapus montanus
Oregon jumping mouse, Zapus oregonus
South Pacific jumping mouse, Zapus pacificus
Southwestern jumping mouse, Zapus princeps
Northwestern jumping mouse, Zapus saltator
North Pacific jumping mouse, Zapus trinotatus

Fossil genera 
In addition, four fossil genera are also definitively known:

 Genus †Javazapus
 Genus †Pliozapus
 Genus †Sinozapus
Genus †Sminthozapus

See also

 Hopping mouse - a murid rodent native to Australia
 Jerboa - a related desert-dwelling dipodid rodent native to northern Africa and Asia
 Kangaroo mouse and kangaroo rat - heteromyid rodents of North America
 Kultarr - an unrelated marsupial with a similar body plan and coloration; an example of convergence
 Springhare - a pedetid rodent native to southern and eastern Africa

References

Zapodidae
Rodent families
Dipodoid rodents
Taxa named by Elliott Coues

Extant Miocene first appearances